Vadodara Airport  is a domestic airport and an Indian Air Force base serving the city of Vadodara, Gujarat, India. It is located in the suburb of Harni, located northeast of Vadodara. It is the third-busiest airport in Gujarat, after Ahmedabad and Surat airports. Vadodara Airport ranked 2nd Cleanest in India.

Terminals
The existing domestic terminal at Vadodara Airport, named after the Maharaja of Baroda State, is distinct from other airports due to its mix of Gujarati architectural styles complete with domes on the roof. The terminal is small and cannot handle large numbers of passengers. The old terminal covers 4,519 square meters and can handle 250 passengers.

To enhance the capacity of the airport as well as to launch international services, it was decided to construct a new Integrated Terminal Building. An international architectural design competition was held to invite designs for the new terminal. Eventually, a design submitted by United States-based consortium Gensler, Frederic Schwartz Architects, and Creative Group from India won the competition and the contract to design the new terminal was awarded to them.

The foundation stone for the new terminal was laid on 26 February 2009. Construction work started in May 2011 and was completed by August 2016. The new terminal has an area of 18,120 sq. meters with the ability to handle 700 passengers (500 domestic and 200 international) per hour. It has 18 check in counters. The AAI has recently constructed a night parking facility at the airport which can park about nine Airbus A320 or Boeing 737 type aircraft, thus reducing the burden at Mumbai Airport and Ahmedabad Airport, proving economical for airlines.

The new terminal building was inaugurated by Prime Minister of India Narendra Modi on 22 October 2016. The terminal, constructed at a cost of ₹ 160 crore, is the greenest domestic airport of india and also the second-greenest airport of India, after Cochin International Airport. The new terminal area also houses a garden featuring artworks and sculptures by local artists (Vadodara is known for its culture, art, and education; it is the Cultural Capital of Gujarat). The new terminal building also holds the world record for the longest single sheet rooftop, measuring at 164.2 meters. Currently, the airport does not handle cargo.

Vadodara Airport received the Swachh Bharat Award 2019 for the cleanest and safest airport in the category of airports having annual passenger handling capacity of 1.5 million.

IAF Station Vadodara
In addition to its own state of art MRO facility for HS 748 and AN-32 aircraft at Vadodara, the Indian Air Force has two transport squadrons, operating under No. 36 Wing IAF, South Western Air Command:
 No. 11 Squadron IAF, Charging Rhinos, which operates HS 748 transport aircraft
 No. 25 Squadron IAF, Himalayan Eagles, equipped with AN-32 aircraft. This Squadron moved here from Chandigarh in Sept 2011

Airlines and destinations

Statistics

Accidents and incidents
On 1 July 1995, an East West Airlines Fokker F-27, registered VT-EWE, was engaged in a training touch and go exercise at Vadodara Airport when the aircraft's left main landing gear failed on touchdown. The aircraft continued moving forward on its belly and skid to a halt on the runway. There was no fire and no injury to persons on board the aircraft. Poor maintenance was cited as a contributory factor in the accident. The aircraft was written off, and is now abandoned near the wall surrounding the airport premises in the mid-runway.

References

External links
Vadodara airport at the Airports Authority of India

Transport in Vadodara
Airports in Gujarat
Buildings and structures in Vadodara
Airports established in 2016
2016 establishments in Gujarat